The Donegal Intermediate Football Championship (abbreviated as Donegal IFC) is an annual football competition organised by Donegal GAA.

An Clochán Liath are the title holders (2022) defeating Naomh Columba in the Final.

History
The competition has been won by 27 clubs, 13 of which have won it more than once. Glenfin, Na Dúnaibh, Naomh Muire, Réalt na Mara, Cloich Cheann Fhaola and Termon are the most successful clubs, each winning three titles.

Declan Bonner was player-manager of the 1989 winning team. He won the Ulster Senior Football Championship with his county in 1990, followed by another in 1992 and the All-Ireland Senior Football Championship of 1992 as well.

The most successful team to have emerged from the Donegal IFC in the 21st-century is Glenswilly. They went on to claim several SFC honours for the first time in club history (2011, 2013, 2016). Neil Gallagher, the future National Football League-winning captain and All Star of the 2012 and 2014 All-Ireland Senior Football Championship, won the Donegal IFC in 2005.

The 2006 final required two replays before Cloich Cheann Fhaola defeated Gaeil Fhánada.

Initially a straight knock-out competition, a round-robin group stage was introduced in 2013.

Men to have won this competition and to have played at senior level for their county include Paddy McConigley (2009), Michael Boyle (2012), Kevin Mulhern (2014), Jamie and Paul Brennan (2015), Frank McGlynn (2018), Stephen Griffin (2019) and Peter Boyle (2020).

Others to have played in this competition and played at senior level for their county include Michael Lynch, Niall McCready and Brian Roper.

Honours
The winning club receives the Cathal McLaughlin Memorial Cup. The winning club is promoted to the Donegal Senior Football Championship for the following season.

The Donegal IFC winner qualifies for the Ulster Intermediate Club Football Championship. It is the only team from County Donegal to qualify for this competition. The Donegal IFC winner may enter the Ulster Intermediate Club Football Championship at either the preliminary round or the quarter-final stage. 

The Donegal IFC winner — by winning the Ulster Intermediate Club Football Championship — may qualify for the All-Ireland Intermediate Club Football Championship, at which it would enter at the semi-final stage, providing it hasn't been drawn to face the British champions in the quarter-finals. The last team from County Donegal to do this was St Michael's in 2004 who went on to reach the final, losing out to Ilen Rovers of Cork.

Winners and finalists

Results by team

Finals listed by year

References

Explanatory notes

Further reading

External links
 Official website of Donegal GAA

Donegal GAA club championships
Intermediate Gaelic football county championships